The Reindeer Section are a Scottish indie rock supergroup formed in 2001 by Gary Lightbody of Snow Patrol, which released albums and gigged in 2001 and 2002.

Lightbody describes the band's sound as "pretty much all very slow, quiet, folky-type stuff. Stuff that I really love listening to, like Low, for example, and Neil Young and Joni Mitchell and all that end of things. It's sort of inspired by those records rather than by the American rock music that inspired me to start a band in the first place."

The songs "You Are My Joy" and "Cartwheels" were featured on the 2009 Snow Patrol best-of album, Up to Now.

History

Formation and Y'All Get Scared Now, Ya Hear!: 2001
The Reindeer Section arose – according to Lightbody – out of a chance get-together of musicians at a Lou Barlow gig in Glasgow in 2001, at which Lightbody drunkenly laid down the challenge to others to "make an album together", to which everyone said "yeah yeah". Lightbody "went home and next day wrote the album" and later convinced Johnny Davis of Bright Star to fund a recording session and release the proposed album. The group met over three days of rehearsal and ten days of recording to produce the first album. Y'All Get Scared Now, Ya Hear! was released on 20 October 2001 with a mini tour, the first venue of which was Belfast's The Limelight. In television, the track "Will You Please Be There For Me" was used in the closing of episode 39 of NBC's Ed.

Son of Evil Reindeer and hiatus: 2002
Son of Evil Reindeer was released ten months after the first, with a slightly different line-up. The single, "You Are My Joy" appeared on US show, Grey's Anatomy, and on the fourth series of US TV series Queer as Folk. The song "Cartwheels" appeared on "The Second Chance", an episode of The O.C.. The band's most recent gig was on 14 December 2002 at the Queen Margaret Union in Glasgow.

Band members
 Alfie
 Ben Dumville
 Lee Gorton
 Sam Morris
 Arab Strap
 Colin Macpherson
 Malcolm Middleton
 Aidan Moffat
 Astrid
 William Campbell
 Charlie Clark
 Neil Payne
 Gareth Russell
 Belle & Sebastian
 Richard Colburn
 Mick Cooke
 Bobby Kildea
 Cadet
 Iain Archer
 Eva
 Jenny Reeve (Strike The Colours)
 Sarah Roberts
 Idlewild
 Roddy Woomble
 Gareth Russell (joined Idlewild in 2006)
 Mogwai
 John Cummings
 Mull Historical Society
 Colin MacIntyre
 Snow Patrol
 Gary Lightbody
 Mark McClelland
 Jonny Quinn
 Teenage Fanclub
 Norman Blake
 The Vaselines
 Eugene Kelly
 The Wendys
 Johnny MacArthur
 Jonathan Renton
 The Moth & the Mirror
 Stacey Sievwright
 Michael Bannister
 Roy Kerr
 Paul Fox
 Marcus Mackay
 Gill Mills
 The Noisy Geese

Discography

Albums

Singles

References

External links
 

Scottish indie rock groups
Musical collectives
British supergroups
Snow Patrol
Musical groups established in 2001